Jahongir Ergashev ,(),(born 6 March 1994) is a Tajik professional footballer who plays as a striker for Khujand and the Tajikistan national team.

Career

Club
In March 2015, Ergashev moved to FK Khujand on a season-long loan deal.

Ergashev was listed in FK Khujand's 2016 AFC Cup squad list, but did not feature in their match against Ahli Al-Khaleel. After a trial with Belshina Bobruisk, Ergashev went on trial with Dinamo Brest, going on to sign a six-month contract with Dinamo Brest on 1 April 2016. Ergashev scored his first goal for Dinamo Brest on 30 April 2016, against Isloch.

Ergashev left Dinamo Brest near the end of January 2017, going on to sign a contract for the 2017 season with FC Istiklol on 14 February 2017. Ergashev was released from his Istiklol contract on 5 July 2017, signing for FK Khujand until the end of the 2017 season on the same day.

On 23 January 2019, Ergashev signed a new contract with FK Khujand.

On 3 November 2019, Ergashev was announced as a new signing for Saif SC prior to the start of the 2019–20 season. On 18 July 2020, FK Khujand announced the return of Ergashev.

In March 2021, Ergashev joined Uzbekistan Super League club Qizilqum Zarafshon.

In January 2022, Kyrgyz Premier League club Neftchi Kochkor-Ata announced that Ergashev had signed a contract to join the club.

On 9 March 2022, Ergashev re-signed for Khujand.

International
Ergashev was part of the Tajikistan U-21's at the 2013 Commonwealth of Independent States Cup, He also scored his first senior goal against Macau in the qualifying tournament for the 2014 AFC Challenge Cup.

Career statistics

Club

International

Statistics accurate as of match played 5 February 2021

International goals
Scores and results list Tajikistan's goal tally first.

References

External links
 
 

1994 births
Living people
People from Sughd Region
Tajikistani footballers
Association football forwards
Tajikistan international footballers
Tajikistani expatriate footballers
Expatriate footballers in Belarus
Expatriate footballers in Bangladesh
Expatriate footballers in Uzbekistan
FC Istiklol players
FK Khujand players
FC Dynamo Brest players
Saif SC players
FC Qizilqum Zarafshon players
Footballers at the 2014 Asian Games
Asian Games competitors for Tajikistan
Tajikistan Higher League players
Tajikistan youth international footballers